This is a list of telephone area codes in the state of Oregon. As of 2022, it is one of six states (along with Pennsylvania, Connecticut, Maryland, Idaho and West Virginia) that is entirely overlaid.

503: The northwestern corner of Oregon, including Portland and its metropolitan area, Salem and other cities

541: All of Oregon outside the northwestern corner, including Eugene

971: An overlay of area code 503.  Until 2008, 971 was a concentrated overlay, meaning it was only present in some parts of the 503 area. Today it is a standard overlay.

458: An overlay of area code 541.

Under the original North American Numbering Plan of 1947, area code 503 covered all of Oregon.  Area code 541 was split off in 1995, the 971 overlay of 503 became active in 2000, and the 458 overlay of 541 became active in 2010.

External links

Area code list
 
Oregon
Area codes